Karow is a German locality (Ortsteil) within the Berlin borough (Bezirk) of Pankow. Until 2001 it was part of the former Weißensee borough.

History

The locality was first mentioned in 1375 with the name of Kare. Autonomous Prussian municipality of the former Niederbarnim district, Karow was incorporated into Berlin in 1920, with the "Greater Berlin Act".

Geography

Overview
Located in the north-eastern suburb of Berlin, it borders with the localities of Buch, Französisch Buchholz, Blankenburg and Stadtrandsiedlung Malchow. It also borders, on the east, with the Brandenburger town of Ahrensfelde, in the district of Barnim. Part of its territory, close to the natural reserve Karower Teiche (in Buchholz) is included in Barnim Nature Park.

Subdivision
Karow counts 1 zone (Ortslage):
 Stadtrandsiedlung Buch

Transport
The locality is served by the S-Bahn station of Karow, on the line S2. This station is also the endpoint of a local railway, the Heidekrautbahn.

The Berliner beltway (A10, known as "Berliner Ring") crosses Karow and separates it from Buch. An exit serving the quarter (n.3 "Bucher Straße") is located on the short motorway A114.

Photogallery

References

Literature
 Martin Eckart Pfannschmidt: "Geschichte der Berliner Vororte Buch und Karow", Berlin 1927

External links

 Karow official site
 Site about Alt-Karow

Localities of Berlin

Populated places established in the 1370s